A cloud-native processor (CNP) is a general purpose central processing unit (CPU) specifically designed to support the growing number of cloud-native computing applications which do not require any on-site computing infrastructure, or software designed specifically to create, build and store information over the cloud. According to the Cloud Native Computing Foundation, cloud-native technologies enable organizations to build and run scalable applications in public, private, and hybrid clouds.

Technology
Cloud-native processor allow for scalability, cost-effectiveness and better energy efficiencies than legacy processors.

Cloud-native versus other processors 
Widely-used x86 processors use simultaneous multithreading where each core has two threads. This works well in enterprise environments where they are utilized by a single entity. In contrast, in a cloud environment, where utilized by multiple users with different applications sharing the same core, they are not able to adjust to changing workloads, compromising performance.

By comparison, cloud-native processors offer 80 and 128 cores and are single threaded, which allows for simultaneous connections in a cloud environment resulting in scalability. The processors are also smaller with more efficient power usage and can run both enterprise and cloud-native applications, making them more cost effective than other alternatives. Cloud-native processors are a useful option for data centers, which are predicted to use 11 percent of the world's electricity by 2030.

Products
Ampere Computing, founded in 2018, released a cloud-native processor in 2020. That processor, the Ampere Altra, and its successor, the Ampere Altra Max, are used by Oracle, Microsoft Azure, Tencent, Alibaba, and ByteDance. In 2021, Alibaba released its Yitian 710 processor as a cloud-native processor. In 2022, Ampere announced a new custom-designed core and AMD and Intel announced they were working on their own cloud-native designs. Hewlett Packard Enterprise also announced a cloud-native server based on Ampere's cloud-native processors.

References

Computer-related introductions in the 21st century
Cloud infrastructure
Instruction set architectures
Network performance
Cloud computing